Mariniluteicoccus flavus is a Gram-positive, aerobic and non-motile bacterium from the genus Mariniluteicoccus which has been isolated from deep-sea sediment from the South China Sea near China.

References 

Propionibacteriales
Bacteria described in 2014